Theo Boshoff (born ) is a South African rugby union player for the  in the Currie Cup. His regular position is fly-half.

He joined the  ahead of the newly formed Super Rugby Unlocked competition in October 2020.

References

South African rugby union players
Living people
1998 births
Rugby union fly-halves
Pumas (Currie Cup) players
Blue Bulls players
Griquas (rugby union) players